Epischidia caesariella is a species of snout moth in the genus Epischidia. It was described by George Hampson in 1901 and is known from Turkey.

References

Moths described in 1901
Phycitini
Endemic fauna of Turkey
Insects of Turkey